SkyWater Technology is an American semiconductor engineering and fabrication foundry, based in Bloomington, Minnesota. It is the only US-owned pure-play silicon foundry.

History  

The company was formed in 2017, when private equity firm Oxbow Industries acquired Cypress Foundry Solutions, a microelectronics fabricator that was previously a subsidiary of California-based Cypress Semiconductor Corp. 

In early 2021, SkyWater acquired an additional chip factory in Osceola, Florida, repurposing the University of Central Florida NeoCity fabrication facility into a second fabrication site. It expanded its facility and add 100 new jobs in 2021, partially due to funding from the Minnesota Department of Employment and Economic Development.

Initial public offering

SkyWater Technology filed an initial public offering with the U.S. Securities and Exchange Commission in March 2021.

U.S. infrastructure investment

SkyWater has been cited as an example of the infrastructure the Biden administration is investing in. On April 12, 2021, President Joe Biden held up a silicon wafer created by SkyWater as he explained that chips represents a form of infrastructure.

On July 20th, 2022 Skywater announces plans to invest 1.8 billion dollars into a manufacturing facility in West Lafayette, Indiana. The facility is within Purdue University's Discovery Park District.

Technology

SkyWater produces semiconductor chips using 90-nanometer process technology on equipment designed to handle 200-millimeter wafers of silicon. SkyWater works in the consumer, industrial, military & defense, and automotive industries. SkyWater is a Department of Defense-accredited Trusted supplier, part of the DOD's efforts to secure a supply chain within the United States.

SkyWater has collaborated with Efabless and Google to create the first open source chip manufacturing program.

On August 21, 2021, SkyWater announced an expanded partnership with Rockley Photonics Holdings, focused on Rockley's health monitoring solution.

References

Semiconductor companies of the United States
Companies based in Minnesota